Irving Singer (December 24, 1925 – February 1, 2015) was an American professor of philosophy who was on the faculty of the Massachusetts Institute of Technology for 55 years and wrote over 20 books.  He was the author of books on various topics, including cinema, love, sexuality, and the philosophy of George Santayana.  He also wrote on the subject of film, including writings about the work of film directors Ingmar Bergman, Alfred Hitchcock.

Biography

Singer was born in Brooklyn, New York City, on December 24, 1925; his parents were Isadore and Nettie Stromer Singer, Jewish immigrants from Austria-Hungary, who owned a grocery store in Coney Island.

Singer skipped three grades in school, graduating from Manhattan's Townsend Harris High School at age 15.

He entered the U.S. Army, serving in World War II, writing History of the 210th Field Artillery Group, which was published by the Army in 1945.

After studying for a short time at Brooklyn College before the war and attending Biarritz American University in Paris just after the war, Singer went to Harvard University on the G.I. Bill, was elected to Phi Beta Kappa, and graduated summa cum laude with an A.B. in 1948.  He did his graduate studies at Oxford University and Harvard, receiving his PhD in philosophy from Harvard in 1952.

Singer taught briefly at Harvard, Cornell University, the University of Michigan, and Johns Hopkins University.  He joined the Massachusetts Institute of Technology in 1958, first as a lecturer, but then promoted to associate professor in 1959, and full professor at 1967. Among the many subjects Singer taught at Massachusetts Institute of Technology were: Philosophy of Love in the Western World, Film as Visual and Literary Philosophy, and The Nature of Creativity.

He died in 2015, aged 89.

Awards

 Four prize essays and other student awards, Harvard University
 ACLS Research Scholar, 1949–1950
 Post-doctoral Fulbright Research Scholar, 1955–1956
 Bollingen Grant-in-aid, 1958, 1959, 1965
 The Hudson Review Fellow in Criticism, 1958–1959
 Guggenheim Fellowship, 1965–1966
 ACLS Grant-in-aid, 1966
 Fellow of the Villa I Tatti, Harvard University Center for Italian Renaissance Studies, Florence, Italy, 1965–1967
 Bollingen Fellowship, 1966–1967
 Rockefeller Foundation Grant, 1970
 Balliol College/MIT Exchange, Oxford University, 1999
 Fellow, European Humanities Research Centre, Oxford University, 1999–2004

Published works

By Singer

 Santayana's Aesthetics: A Critical Analysis (1957) 
 The Goals of Human Sexuality (1973) 
 Mozart and Beethoven: The Concept of Love in Their Operas (1977) 
 The Nature of Love Volume 1: Plato to Luther (1984) 
 The Nature of Love Volume 2: Courtly and Romantic (1984)  
 The Nature of Love Volume 3: The Modern World (1987)  
 Meaning in Life: The Creation of Value (1992, 1996) 
 Meaning in Life Volume 2: The Pursuit of Love (1994) 
 Meaning in Life Volume 3: The Harmony of Nature and Spirit (1996) 
 Reality Transformed: Film as Meaning and Technique (1998) 
 George Santayana, Literary Philosopher (2000) 
 Feeling and Imagination: The Vibrant Flux of Our Existence (2001)
 Explorations in Love and Sex (2001)  
 Sex: A Philosophical Primer (2001, expanded edition: 2004) 
 Three Philosophical Filmmakers: Hitchcock, Welles, Renoir (2004) 
 Ingmar Bergman, Cinematic Philosopher: Reflections on his Creativity (2007) 
 Cinematic Mythmaking: Philosophy in Film (2008) 
 Philosophy of Love: A Partial Summing-Up (2009) 
 Modes of Creativity: Philosophical Perspectives (2011)

About Singer
 The Nature and Pursuit of Love: The Philosophy of Irving Singer (Prometheus Books, 1995) — based on academic papers presented at a three-day conference about Singer at Brock University in 1991

References

External links 
MIT philosophy: faculty: Irving Singer — main faculty biography
Irving Singer: List of Publications on the M.I.T. Faculty Bibliographies site
Curriculum vitae on the MIT website
The Irving Singer Library at MIT Press
 Reviews
Reviews by Singer and replies by Singer in the New York Review of Books
Review of Singer, Three Philosophical Filmmakers, by Daniel Ross
Review of Singer, Ingmar Bergman, Cinematic Philosopher and Cinematic Mythmaking, by Daniel Ross
Review of Singer, Reality Transformed, by Melissa Ursula Dawn Goldsmith
 Video
  — Irving Singer course lecture, derived from the MIT OpenCourseWare project

American people of Hungarian-Jewish descent
1925 births
2015 deaths
20th-century American philosophers
21st-century American philosophers
Jewish American writers
Jewish philosophers
Harvard University alumni
Harvard University faculty
MIT School of Humanities, Arts, and Social Sciences faculty
Rockefeller Fellows
Writers from Brooklyn
Townsend Harris High School alumni
Brooklyn College alumni
Fulbright alumni